The 1964 Lady Wigram Trophy was a motor race held at the Wigram Airfield Circuit on 18 January 1964. It was the thirteenth Lady Wigram Trophy to be held and was won by Bruce McLaren for the second year in succession in the Cooper T70. After having started eighth after a dismal performance in the preliminary heat, McLaren came through the pack to take the win in what he described as his greatest performance. Jack Brabham took second place after a strong performance throughout the weekend whilst Denny Hulme came home third after losing second on the final lap due to engine bearing issues.

Classification

References

Lady Wigram Trophy
Lady
January 1964 sports events in New Zealand